The Technical Advisory Service for Images (TASI) provides advice to the United Kingdom's Further Education (FE) and Higher Education (HE) communities in the creation and use of digital images.  Its services include a Web site , helpdesk, training programme, and mailing list. TASI is funded by the Joint Information Systems Committee (Jisc) and based within the Institute for Learning and Research Technology (ILRT) of the University of Bristol.

References

External links 
TASI

Educational organisations based in the United Kingdom
Further education colleges in the United Kingdom
Higher education in the United Kingdom
Information technology organisations based in the United Kingdom
Jisc
University of Bristol